The 1997–98 FR Yugoslavia Cup was the sixth season of the FR Yugoslavia's annual football cup. The cup defenders was Red Star Belgrade, but was defeated by FK Obilić in the semi-finals. FK Partizan has the winner of the competition, after they defeated FK Obilić.

First round
Thirty-two teams entered in the First Round. The matches were played on 3 September 1997.

|}
Note: Roman numerals in brackets denote the league tier the clubs participated in the 1997–98 season.

Second round
The 16 winners from the prior round enter this round.
 

|}
Note: Roman numerals in brackets denote the league tier the clubs participated in the 1997–98 season.

Quarter-finals
The eight winners from the prior round enter this round. The first legs were played on 19 November and the second legs were played on 3 December 1997.

|}

Semi-finals
The eight winners from the prior round enter this round. The first legs were played on 18 March and the second legs were played on 1 April 1998.

|}

Final

First leg

Second leg

Partizan won 2–0 on aggregate.

See also
 1997–98 First League of FR Yugoslavia
 1997–98 Second League of FR Yugoslavia

References

External links
Results on RSSSF

FR Yugoslavia Cup
Cup
Yugo